Citreorosein is a polyketide made by Penicillium that has antimicrobial activity.

References

Polyketides
Primary alcohols
Trihydroxyanthraquinones